Christian Wagner (born 26 September 1959) is a German film director, producer and screenwriter. He has directed twelve films since 1981. His 1995 film Transatlantis was entered into the 45th Berlin International Film Festival.

Selected filmography
 Waller's Last Trip (1989)
 Transatlantis (1995)
 Warchild (2006)

References

External links

1959 births
Living people
Film people from Bavaria
People from Immenstadt